The ECB40, last known as the Yorkshire Bank 40 (YB40) for sponsorship reasons, was a forty-over limited overs cricket competition for the English first-class counties. It began in the 2010 English cricket season as a replacement for the Pro40 and Friends Provident Trophy competitions. Yorkshire Bank were the last sponsors, taking over the naming rights from their parent company Clydesdale Bank for the 2013 edition. Warwickshire won the inaugural tournament. The competition was replaced by a 50-over tournament, to bring the domestic game in line with the international game from 2014 on—the Royal London One-Day Cup.

History

In 2009, in light of the growth of Twenty20 cricket with the Twenty20 Cup, Indian Premier League and ICC World Twenty20, the ECB realised that the Pro40 and Friends Provident Trophy were attracting less interest. Plans began to consolidate the List A competitions into a single 40-over trophy. The competition began in the 2010 English cricket season with Clydesdale Bank, previously sponsor of the Twenty20 Cup, agreeing to a three-year sponsorship. John Perera, ECB commercial director, stated that "We are delighted to welcome Clydesdale Bank as the title sponsor for the 40-over competition particularly as it gives us an opportunity to build on an already strong working relationship. The Clydesdale Bank 40 is an exciting new competition and the format is designed to comfortably fit into the busy family weekend." Ireland and Scotland, were asked to compete, following their entry in the Friends Provident Trophy, but Ireland declined in order to concentrate on their growing international commitments; The Netherlands took their place. A new team, the Unicorns cricket team, was formed of contractless county players to compete, unpaid, alongside the 18 first-class counties, Scotland and the Netherlands.

Warwickshire beat Somerset in the final of the inaugural 2010 tournament. The format for the 2011 competition was kept the same, despite calls for the number of county matches to be reduced; fewer group matches were proposed for the 2012 season, with the addition of a quarter-final knock-out round. Unicorns competed, and held a fresh set of trials over the winter period.

Participating teams and format
The competition contained three groups of seven. A random draw was used to place the teams into groups. The top team of each group, together with the second best team across all three groups, progressed to two semi-finals, the winners of which faced off in the final for the trophy. The participating teams were the 18 first-class counties plus Scotland, Netherlands and Unicorns.

Derbyshire Falcons
Durham Dynamos
Essex Eagles
Glamorgan
Gloucestershire Gladiators
Hampshire Royals
Kent Spitfires
Lancashire Lightning
Leicestershire Foxes
Middlesex Panthers
Netherlands
Northamptonshire Steelbacks
Nottinghamshire Outlaws
Scottish Saltires
Somerset
Surrey
Sussex Sharks
Unicorns
Warwickshire Bears
Worcestershire Royals
Yorkshire Vikings

Results

Records

Team
Most runs in an innings: 399/4, Sussex Sharks v Worcestershire Royals, 14 August 2011.
Most runs batting second: 337/7, Kent Spitfires v Sussex Sharks, 19 June 2013 (world record in 40-over game).
Lowest total in an innings: 57, Netherlands v Worcestershire, 8 June 2012.

Individual
Most runs in an innings: 180, Ryan ten Doeschate for Essex Eagles v Scottish Saltires, 2 June 2013.
Most runs in a tournament: 861, Jacques Rudolph for Yorkshire Carnegie (2010).
Best bowling figures: 7/29, David Payne for Gloucestershire Gladiators v Essex Eagles, 9 May 2010 (including a hat-trick).
Most wickets in a tournament: 28, Michael Hogan for Glamorgan (2013).

Sponsors
2010–2012 Clydesdale Bank
2013 Yorkshire Bank

References

 
English domestic cricket competitions
Professional 40-over cricket competitions
Recurring sporting events established in 2010
Recurring sporting events disestablished in 2013
List A cricket competitions